The Brazilian ironclad Barroso was an armoured gunboat built for the Brazilian Navy during the Paraguayan War in the mid-1860s. Barroso bombarded Paraguayan fortifications in 1866 and 1867 a number of times before she participated in the Passagem de Humaitá in February 1868. Afterwards the ship provided fire support for the army for the rest of the war. She was assigned to the Mato Grosso Flotilla after the war. Barroso was decommissioned in 1882, but was not scrapped until 1937.

Design and description
Barroso was designed to meet the need of the Brazilian Navy for a small, simple, shallow-draft armored ship capable of withstanding heavy fire. The ship is best characterized as a central battery design because the casemate did not extend the length of the ship. The hull was sheathed with Muntz metal to reduce biofouling. On riverine operations, the bulwarks and the ship's masts were usually removed.

Her crew numbered 149 officers and men.

Propulsion
Barroso had a single John Penn & Sons 2-cylinder steam engine driving a single 2-bladed propeller. Her engine was powered by two tubular boilers. The ship's funnel was mounted directly in front of her casemate. Barroso carried enough coal for six days' steaming.

Armament
Barroso mounted one 120-pounder Whitworth and two 70-pounder Whitworth rifled muzzle loaders, two 68-pounder and two 12-pounder smoothbore guns in her casemate. To minimize the possibility of shells or splinters entering the casemate through the gun ports they were as small as possible, allowing only a 24°-arc of fire for each gun. The rectangular,  casemate had two gun ports on each side as well as the front and rear.

The exact type of 12-pounder gun is not known. All of the guns could fire both solid shot and explosive shells.

Armor

It had a maximum thickness of  covering the machinery and magazines,  elsewhere.

Service

Barroso was laid down at the Arsenal de Marinha da Côrte in Rio de Janeiro on 21 February 1865. She was launched on 4 November 1865 and completed on 11 January 1866. On 26–28 March 1866 she bombarded the Paraguayan fortifications at Curupaity where she was hit 20 times, but not significantly damaged. The ships bombarded Curupaity again on 4 September and Barroso was hit four more times. On 22 September the Allied army attempted to storm the fortifications at Curupaity, supported by fire from the Brazilian ironclads, but was rebuffed with heavy losses. Between 24 and 29 December Barroso, Tamandaré, Brasil, and 11 gunboats bombarded Curuzu Fort again.

The Brazilians broke through the river defences at Curupaity during daylight on 15 August 1867 with Barroso, Tamanadaré, and eight other ironclads. The ships were hit 256 times, but not seriously damaged, and only suffered 10 killed and 22 wounded. They repeated the operation again on 9 September. On 19 February 1868 six Brazilian ironclads, including Barroso, steamed past Humaitá at night. Barroso led with Rio Grande, followed by Bahia with Alagoas and Tamandaré with Pará. Barroso continued upstream with the other undamaged ships and they bombarded Asunción on 24 February. On 23 March Rio Grande and Barroso sank the steamer Igurey and both ships were boarded by Paraguayan soldiers on the evening of 9 July, although they managed to repel the boarders.

After the war the ship served with the Mato Grosso Flotilla and was decommissioned in 1882. However, Barroso was not scrapped until 1937.

Footnotes

References

External links
 Brief history of Barroso 

Ships built in Brazil
Gunboats of the Brazilian Navy
Ironclad warships of the Brazilian Navy
1865 ships
Riverine warfare